Hobert is a surname. Notable people with the surname include:

Billy Joe Hobert (born 1971), American football player
Bob Hobert (born 1935), Canadian football player
Ingfried Hobert (born 1960), German doctor
Michael Hobert, American actor
Richard Hobert (born 1951), Swedish screenwriter and film director